Fagerström is a surname, with the variant spelling Fagerstrom. Notable people with these surnames include:

People with the surname Fagerström 
Ann-Marie Fagerström (born 1953), Swedish politician
Asser Fagerström (1912–1990), Finnish pianist, composer and actor
Christoffer Fagerström (born 1992), Swedish bandy player
Jarl Fagerström (1914–1975), Finnish sprint canoer
Linda Fagerström (born 1977), Swedish footballer

People with the surname Fagerstrom 
Douglas L. Fagerstrom, American theologian